Max Golser (4 May 1940 – 23 April 2019) was an Austrian ski jumper. He competed at the 1968 Winter Olympics and the 1972 Winter Olympics.

References

1940 births
2019 deaths
Austrian male ski jumpers
Olympic ski jumpers of Austria
Ski jumpers at the 1968 Winter Olympics
Ski jumpers at the 1972 Winter Olympics
Sportspeople from Tyrol (state)
20th-century Austrian people